This Gift is the third album by Sons and Daughters, released by Domino Records on 28 January 2008 on CD and LP format.

It is also available as a limited edition two-disc version, featuring six additional live tracks. The album charted at number 66.

Track listing
 "Gilt Complex" - 3:39
 "Split Lips" - 2:18
 "The Nest" - 4:14
 "Rebel with the Ghost" - 3:01
 "Chains" - 2:37
 "This Gift" - 4:06
 "Darling" - 3:21
 "Flags" - 3:08
 "Iodine" - 3:02
 "The Bell" - 2:46
 "House in My Head" - 3:51
 "Goodbye Service" - 4:37
 "Killer" - 4:04. (iTunes Bonus Track, a cover of the popular song by Adamski and Seal)

Two disc set
"Chains (live)"
"Darling (live)"
"Gilt Complex (live)"
"The Nest (live)"
"House in My Head (live)"
"Johnny Cash (live)"

References

2008 albums
Sons and Daughters (band) albums
Albums produced by Bernard Butler
Domino Recording Company albums